Kardla is a village in Tähtvere Parish, Tartu County, Estonia.

References

 

Villages in Tartu County